Othos is one of the ten towns on the island of Karpathos, Greece. At an elevation of 508 metres, Othos is the highest town in Karpathos. It is twelve kilometres outside . It is built on the southern slopes of Mount Meloura, which is in the southern part of Lastos, at an altitude of 514 meters [2]. It is the most mountainous village of the island and one of the most mountainous in the prefecture of Dodecanese, its houses are built with traditional architecture and overlook the east coast of Karpathos and the Aegean. The Town of Othos includes Othos Village and the nearby settlements of Stes and Kallenes. In 2011, the Town of Othos recorded a census population of 281 residents, making it the sixth-largest town on the island.

Othos Village is frequented daily by bus from Pigadia. It has two bars and a small folklore museum.

References

Populated places in Karpathos (regional unit)